Dennis Hettinga (born 12 September 1995) is a Dutch footballer. He formerly played for Go Ahead Eagles and TOP Oss.

Club career
He made his Eerste Divisie debut for Go Ahead Eagles on 8 September 2017 in a game against FC Volendam.

References

External links
 
 

1995 births
Footballers from Deventer
Living people
Dutch footballers
Go Ahead Eagles players
TOP Oss players
Eerste Divisie players
Rohda Raalte players
Association football defenders